The Salamanca Island Road Park is a national park located in the Caribbean Region of Colombia, on the western outskirts of the city of Ciénaga in the Magdalena Department. The flora and fauna is in abundance because of the confluence of sweet water flowing from the Magdalena River and saline water of the Caribbean Sea. It was created in 1964 to protect the abundant bird life and coastal mangroves.

 is included in the Spanish name because of the road that runs through it, connecting Santa Marta with Barranquilla. In 2000 the park was designated a Biosphere reserve by UNESCO.

Climate
The climate is arid and dry and the temperature averages between 28-30 °C. The average yearly rainfall is 400 mm in the eastern part of the area, and 760 mm in the western part. The volume of water lost through evaporation and plant transpiration is greater than rainfall, leading to a water deficit.

Flora and fauna
Mangrove forests, tropical dry forests and riparian forest cover most of the area. The mangroves cover a third of the area (12,000 hectares) and the three predominant species are: red mangrove, black mangrove, white mangrove and buttonwood.

The park has an abundant variety of wildlife, many of them endangered. The existence of 33 species of mammals indicates a maintained high diversity, despite the environmental problems affecting the ecosystem. The park is home to 98 species of invertebrates, nine species of amphibians, 35 species of reptiles, more than 140 fish species and 199 birds, many of which are migratory, endemic and residents.

Footnotes

References

External links
The park's page at Parques Nacionales Naturales de Colombia 

National parks of Colombia
Protected areas established in 1964
Geography of Magdalena Department
1964 establishments in Colombia
Tourist attractions in Magdalena Department